"Paparazzi" is a song by American singer Lady Gaga from her debut studio album, The Fame (2008). It was released as the album's fifth and final single by Interscope Records. Gaga wrote and produced the song with Rob Fusari. The song portrays Gaga's struggles in her quest for fame, as well as balancing success and love. Musically, it is an uptempo synth-pop and dance-pop ballad whose lyrics describe a stalker following somebody to grab attention and fame.

The single was released on May 29, 2009, through the music video. On July 6, 2009, it was released digitally in Ireland and the United Kingdom and four days later physically in Australia. "LoveGame" initially had been planned as the third single release in the UK, but when its lyrics and music video were deemed potentially controversial, it was decided that "Paparazzi" would be released instead. "Paparazzi" was critically acclaimed for its "fun-filled" and club-friendly nature. It was also commercially successful, reaching top-ten positions in the music charts of Australia, Canada, Ireland, the United Kingdom, and the United States and topping the charts in the Czech Republic, Germany and Scotland.

The accompanying music video was directed by Jonas Åkerlund and portrays Gaga as a doomed starlet, hounded by photographers, who is almost killed by her boyfriend (played by Alexander Skarsgård). It shows her survival, comeback, revenge on her boyfriend, and experiences on the way to fame. The video won two MTV Video Music Awards in 2009 for Best Art Direction and Best Special Effects. Gaga performed the song at the 2009 MTV Video Music Awards in a performance art piece symbolizing the negative effect of fame leading to death. Additional live performances of the song took place during many of her concert tours and residency shows.

Background and release
Before she rose to fame, Lady Gaga met music producer Rob Fusari in March 2006 and began dating him in May. Gaga traveled daily to New Jersey to work on songs she had written and compose new material with Fusari. While working together, he compared some of her vocal harmonies to those of Freddie Mercury, lead singer of Queen. He also created the "Lady Gaga" moniker after the Queen song "Radio Ga Ga". Although the musical relationship between Fusari and Gaga was unsuccessful at first, the pair soon started writing more songs for Gaga. Towards the end of 2007, Gaga's management company introduced her to songwriter and producer RedOne, whom they also managed.

By 2008, Gaga relocated to Los Angeles to work extensively with her record label to complete her debut album, The Fame, and set up her own creative team called the Haus of Gaga. "Paparazzi" was one of the songs written by Gaga and Fusari who also produced the track. In a 2009 interview with Rolling Stone, Gaga recalled her relationship with a heavy metal drummer called Luke, who became an inspiration for most of the songs on The Fame, including "Paparazzi". The song became a symbol for Gaga to escape her own narcissism and desire for fame. She was infatuated with Luke, calling him "the love of her life", and ready to be his fan, to turn the camera around and photograph him.

To the Australian Daily Telegraph, Gaga explained that "Paparazzi" was about struggling to balance success and love. Further explanations said that the song was about trying to win the paparazzi and the media in one's favor. "It's a love song for the cameras, but it's also a love song about fame or love – can you have both, or can you only have one", she concluded. "Paparazzi" was the album's third single in Ireland, Italy, and the United Kingdom, the fourth in Canada and the United States and the fifth in Australia, France and New Zealand. Although released on July 6, 2009, in the United Kingdom and four days later in Australia, "LoveGame" initially had been planned as the third single release in the former but deeming its lyrics and music video potentially controversial, it was decided that "Paparazzi" would be released instead.

Recording and composition

"Paparazzi" was recorded at 150 Studios in Parsippany-Troy Hills, New Jersey. Along with the production and songwriting of the track, Gaga also did the background vocals and played piano and synthesizer. Calvin "Sci-Fidelty" Gaines did the programming and Fusari did the audio engineering and recording. Other personnel involved in creating the final version of the song included Robert Orton who did the audio mixing, and Gene Grimaldi who mastered the song at Oasis Mastering Studios, Burbank, California.

"Paparazzi" is a dance-pop and techno-pop song with an uptempo, sultry beat similar to Gaga's previous singles "Just Dance" and "Poker Face". According to the sheet music published by Sony/ATV Music Publishing, the song has a moderate electro-synth groove. It is composed in the key of C minor (A major in the chorus) with a tempo of 115 beats per minute. It is set in common time, and Gaga's vocal range spans from a low-note of G3 to the high-note of E5. The verses follow in the chord progression of Cm–A–Cm and the chorus uses an A–E–Fm–D progression. The lyrics of "Paparazzi" deal with stalking and the trappings of fame. Gaga sings about her desire to get attention from the cameras: "I'm your biggest fan/I'll follow you until you love me/Papa, paparazzi."

Critical reception
The song received acclaim from music critics, and has been considered one of the best songs in Gaga's discography years after its release. In 2011, Rolling Stone called it the second greatest Gaga song of all time, praising the song's theme and beat. Jill Menze of Billboard, while reviewing The Fame Ball Tour, complimented Gaga's vocals on the song by saying, "The fame-obsessed ballad 'Paparazzi' showed how adept she can be with her range." Alexis Petridis of The Guardian said that, "You may quickly tire of hearing the album's theme constantly reiterated, but the tune of 'Paparazzi' takes up residence in your brain and refuses to budge." Stephen Thomas Erlewine of AllMusic called the song clever and said that it "functions simultaneously as glorious pop trash and a wicked parody of it."

Priya Elan of The Times thought that "even the trio of songs that provides the core of the album's celebrity theme ('Paparazzi', 'Beautiful Dirty Rich', and the title track) don't ruminate on the addictive inanity of fame, choosing instead to observe passively." David Balls from Digital Spy praised Gaga's decision of releasing a mid-tempo track after two uptempos ("Just Dance" and "Poker Face") saying that "thanks to a typically catchy chorus and some smart, celebrity-themed lyrics, very nearly as thrilling in the finish. Backed with a hilariously self-indulgent video, it seems GaGa still has us firmly in her clutch and, ahem, squealing for more."

Evan Sawdey of PopMatters said that both "Paparazzi" and the earlier single "Poker Face" are comparable with the musical styles of first single "Just Dance" but added that "never once does it feel like Gaga is deliberately repeating herself; instead, her faults only come from covering territory that she's obviously not prepared for." Freedom du Lac of The Washington Post said that even though Gaga turns somewhat serious while disapprovingly singing "Paparazzi", the song comes across as flat and faceless as well as vapid. Erika Howard of the New Times Broward-Palm Beach called it the most telling track from the album.

Jon Caramanica of The New York Times said that "'Paparazzi' is a love letter from camera to subject but stops short of admitting that the affection runs both ways. Any notion that Lady Gaga is sketching an elaborate stunt is stopped cold at the lyric sheet, a perverse flaunting of simplicity that betrays no cynicism whatsoever." Pitchfork Media ranked "Paparazzi" number 83 on their list of 2009's 100 best tracks. NME ranked it at number 9 in their list of the best songs of 2009.

Chart performance

In the United States, the song debuted on the Billboard Hot 100 at number 74 on the issue dated September 12, 2009, and reached a peak of number six, becoming her fourth consecutive top-ten single on the chart. With the song, Gaga joined Christina Aguilera, Beyoncé, and Fergie as the only women this decade to collect four Hot 100 top-tens from a debut album. It also reached the top of Billboard Pop Songs chart, thus making Gaga the first artist in the 17-year history of Pop Songs chart to have her first four singles from a debut album reach the top of the chart. The song also topped the Hot Dance Club Songs chart. As of February 2018, it has sold 3.6 million digital downloads in the United States according to Nielsen Soundscan. It became Gaga's fourth song to top the three-million mark, and was certified five-times Platinum by the Recording Industry Association of America (RIAA). "Paparazzi" debuted on the Canadian Hot 100 at number 92 and moved up to number 57 the following week becoming the week's greatest digital gainer. The song ultimately peaked at number three on the chart, in its 13th week.

"Paparazzi" debuted on the official Australian Singles Chart at number 73 on the issue dated June 1, 2009, and leaped to 27 the next week. The song ultimately peaked at number two, giving Gaga her fourth top five single in Australia. The song was certified two-times Platinum by the Australian Recording Industry Association (ARIA) for shipment of 140,000 copies. In New Zealand, "Paparazzi" debuted at number 23 on the week ending June 22, 2009, and reached a peak of number five. The song was certified Gold by the Recording Industry Association of New Zealand (RIANZ) after 14 weeks on the chart, for shipping over 7,500 copies.

In the UK, "Paparazzi" debuted on the UK Singles Chart at number 99 in February 2009 due to digital downloads after the release of The Fame. It reached number 13 for the issue dated June 21, 2009, after jumping from 43 to this position from the last week. The next week the song further climbed to number eight and ultimately peaked at number four. As of July 2022, the song has sold 942,000 copies in the UK with 39 million streams and is certified platinum by the British Phonographic Industry (BPI). "Paparazzi" debuted at number 38 on the Irish Singles Chart and peaked at number four. "Paparazzi" reached number one in Germany, making it her second chart-topper there. The song also debuted on the Dutch Top 40 at number 27 on the issue dated July 18, 2009. It peaked at number four on its sixth week on the chart. In Italy, the song debuted at number 19 and then climbed to number three, becoming Gaga's second top three there.

Music video

Development
The music video was directed by Swedish director, Jonas Åkerlund, who had previously directed music videos for artists like the Smashing Pumpkins, Madonna, Moby, Rammstein, and U2. His wife Bea Åkerlund was hired as Gaga's stylist for the video. It was filmed on April 13 & 14, 2009 at Villa de León in Malibu, California, and at Chateau d'Or in Bel Air, Los Angeles. Gaga told MTV News that she was satisfied with the finished version of the "Paparazzi" video, likening it to a short film. In an interview with The Canadian Press on May 26, 2009, Gaga cited her video as "the most amazing creative work that [she's] put together so far." She went on to describe the message of the video:
It has a real, genuine, powerful message about fame-whoring and death and the demise of the celebrity, and what that does to young people. The video explores ideas about sort of hyperbolic situations that people will go to in order to be famous. Most specifically, pornography and murder. These are some of the major themes in the video.
Later, in her V magazine cover story, Gaga believed that Diana, Princess of Wales was referenced in the video, claiming she died because of being a martyr symbolic of fame. The video was supposed to premiere on June 4, 2009, in the United Kingdom and Ireland, on Channel 4. However, while touring in Australia, Gaga posted a message on her Twitter account on May 29, 2009, saying "Stop leaking my motherf**king videos", which referred to the video being released without the singer's consent.

Synopsis

The music video is seven minutes long. Swedish actor Alexander Skarsgård plays Gaga's boyfriend. The video features a murderous plot line involving a doomed starlet who is constantly followed by photographers. The video opens with a shot of a seaside mansion, where Gaga and her boyfriend are shown lying on a bed talking in Swedish. They move to the balcony and start making out; however, when hidden photographers start taking pictures of them, Gaga realizes that her boyfriend has set the paparazzi to photograph her and tries to stop him. Her struggles nevertheless remain futile even when she punches him, and in a final frantic attempt at defense, she smashes a nearby bottle of liquor into his face. The enraged boyfriend throws her over the balcony. Gaga lies on the ground in her own blood as the photographers continue to take pictures of her bloody body and tabloid headlines proclaim that her career is over. According to Rolling Stone, this scene pays homage to Alfred Hitchcock's film Vertigo (1958).

Later, Gaga is shown getting out of a limousine, being carried by male dancers to a wheelchair. It is during this scene that the song starts. As the dancers gyrate around her, she starts walking down the carpet with the help of a pair of crutches while wearing a metallic bustier and a matching helmet. The metallic outfit is a reference to the film Metropolis (1927). These scenes are interspersed with scenes of dead models lying around the mansion. Next Gaga is shown on a golden couch where she makes out with a trio of hair metal rockers during the line "Loving you is cherry pie". The trio, which consist of the triplets Calle "Kelii" Landeberg, Nisse "Izzy" Landeberg, and Pelle "Rock" Landeberg are known as Snake of Eden and they are from the reality television dating program Daisy of Love. According to MTV, this scene is a reference to the song "Cherry Pie" by American glam band Warrant. The video continues through the intermediate bridge with Gaga wearing a dress made up of film strips and a towering feathered Mohawk headdress.

In the next scene, Gaga and her eye-patch wearing boyfriend are reading magazines on a sofa in a tea room. Gaga wears a yellow jumpsuit with circular glasses and shoulder pads. The Guardian compared this look with that of Minnie Mouse. She finally takes her revenge on her boyfriend by discreetly poisoning his drink with white powder concealed in her ring. As he falls dead, Gaga calls 9-1-1 and declares that she just killed her boyfriend. The police arrive at the mansion and arrest Gaga who, wearing a tall ice cream cone corkscrew wig, walks to the police car as the paparazzi surround her once again. Images flash by, with newspapers proclaiming her innocence and that Gaga is back in the spotlight and has regained her fame. The video ends with Gaga posing for mug shots like a fashion model while wearing a tulip shaped metallic dress similar to the single cover.

Reception
Rolling Stone writer Daniel Kreps compared the video with the 1992 music video for "November Rain" by Guns N' Roses. He described the scenes of the dead models as stomach-turning while complimenting the video for "brimming with cinematic style [so] that it's hard to take your eyes off it, though it will likely be labeled as a little self-indulgent." He also commented on the leaking of the video, saying that it "warranted more than just a simple leak; it deserved a red carpet." Anna Pickard from The Guardian complimented the video saying that "quite a lot of work has gone into it". However, she opined that the video was too long. Entertainment Weekly gave a positive review of the video, saying "it gives us even more of the next-level cuckoo we've come to expect from the girl born Stefani Joanne Angelina Germanotta." The paparazzi theme of the video was compared to Britney Spears' 2004 music video, "Everytime". MTV News called the video a "1940s romantic-epic-style video" that "proves once and for all that Gaga is a true original with a unique vision." The video was nominated for five VMAs at the 2009 awards in the categories of Best Direction, Best Editing, Best Special Effects, Best Cinematography and Best Art Direction. Along with four other nominations for "Poker Face", she and Beyoncé were tied for most nominations that year. The video won the award for Best Art Direction and Best Special Effects. The music video for Gaga's single "Telephone" is a continuation of the "Paparazzi" music video, and is a short film as well. The video picks up right where "Paparazzi" left off; starting with Gaga in prison.

Live performances

Gaga performed "Paparazzi" live on the UK program, The Album Chart Show on February 14, 2009, as promotion for The Fame. The song was performed at Capital Radio 95.8 FM in an acoustic piano version on May 1, 2009. On June 26, 2009, Gaga performed the song at the Glastonbury Festival emerging from a silver case on stage. The song was a major part of Gaga's performance in her first headlining Fame Ball tour as the opening number of the setlist. The show started with a video intro called "The Heart" where Gaga played an alternate persona called Candy Warhol. She wore a silver and black short skirt like a tutu and shaped like peplum on both sides. She was surrounded by her dancers holding plates which were encrusted with crystals and completely hid them. The stage was surrounded by mechanical fog and heavy lighting was being emitted from the background.

"Paparazzi" was performed at the 2009 MTV Video Music Awards, which began with Gaga lying on the floor, on a set that was described as an ornate mansion. She stumbled across the stage and did choreographed dance moves, finally ending up playing a piano. The final chorus involved theatrical blood dripping from Gaga's ribcage as Gaga collapsed on the stage wailing in agony and one of the dancers gently lifted her. Gaga then hung lifeless with one hand rising above her dancers and blood smeared on her face with a golden halo being projected on the screen behind her. Gaga dedicated the performance to her fans. Ashley Laderer from Billboard opined that "this was the performance that really made Lady Gaga. It proved she was more than just a superficial pop star—she was an artist, and quite unlike one we'd ever seen before, a true force to be reckoned with."  Morgan Evans of Harper's Bazaar thought that Gaga's VMA performance "introduced the world to the darker, edgier side she would soon become known for." 

The song was performed by Gaga in a similar choreography at the thirty-fifth season of NBC's late night comedy show Saturday Night Live. It was also present on the set list of Gaga's Monster Ball Tour (2009–2011). On the original version of the show, she wore multiple donned braided extensions and was perched atop a railing. From each of her braids, a dancer was attached on the stage. A backdrop of stars were shown during the performance. During the revised Monster Ball shows, Gaga changed the concept and the performance of the song. She wore an emerald green dress by Thierry Mugler, and was attacked by a giant, mechanical Angler fish. Gaga then removed the dress to reveal a leotard of the same color and during the bridge she is lowered beneath the stage to acquire her pyro-technic bra. In the final chorus of the song Gaga returns and kills the monster with the sparks from the bra. The song was part of the setlist of Gaga's 2012–2013 tour, the Born This Way Ball. Gaga was notably absent from stage for the first two minutes of the song, and  "Mother G.O.A.T.", a floating mechanical head performed it instead of her. Gaga then emerged on stage, and concluded the song while shooting the head, making it to cry blood. 

During the ArtRave: The Artpop Ball tour (2014), Gaga performed "Paparazzi" dressed up in a polka-dotted rubber outfit with tentacles growing out around her waist and her head. Rob Sheffield from Rolling Stone described her look as "she had an inflatable rubber order of fried calamari growing out of her spine", while Adam Carlson from Billboard said that the outfit made Gaga look like a "dancing Ursula from The Little Mermaid ". The song was added to the setlist of the Joanne World Tour (2017–2018), where she was wearing a red leather bodysuit and tassel leather boots, and the performance ended with a choreographed attack on Gaga by her dancers. 

"Paparazzi" was performed on Lady Gaga Enigma + Jazz & Piano (2018–2022), the singer's Las Vegas residency, which consist of two different shows. On the Enigma shows, she performs "Paparazzi" in a floating orb-like cage that is elevated above the audience, while on the Jazz and Piano show, she performs it on the piano, with "the full orchestra kicking in with some apropos suspense-movie chase music". Talking about the latter, John Katsilometes of the Las Vegas Review-Journal argued that "a live version of that song in Vegas would be a hit single", saying that the "raging" performance "always jolts the crowd to a standing ovation".

Track listing 

UK / AUS CD single
 "Paparazzi" (Album Version) – 3:28
 "Paparazzi" (Filthy Dukes Remix) – 5:21

CAN / AUS / US / FRA remix EP
 "Paparazzi" (Stuart Price Remix) – 3:19
 "Paparazzi" (Moto Blanco Edit) – 4:05
 "Paparazzi" (Filthy Dukes Club Mix) – 5:21
 "Paparazzi" (James Carameta Tabloid Club Edit) – 4:27

UK / IRE remix EP
 "Paparazzi" – 3:27
 "Paparazzi" (Filthy Dukes Club Mix) – 5:21
 "Paparazzi" (Moto Blanco Edit) – 4:05
 "Paparazzi" (Stuart Price Remix) – 3:19
 "Paparazzi" (Yuksek Remix) – 4:47

US iTunes Remix EP #2
 "Paparazzi" (Chew Fu Ghettohouse Radio Edit) – 3:39
 "Paparazzi" (Yuksek Remix) – 4:47
 "Paparazzi" (James Camareta Tabloid Club Edit) – 4:27

US 'The Remixes' CD single
 "Paparazzi" (Demolition Crew Remix) – 3:55
 "Paparazzi" (Moto Blanco Edit) – 4:05
 "Paparazzi" (Stuart Price Remix) – 3:19
 "Paparazzi" (Filthy Dukes Club Mix) – 5:21
 "Paparazzi" (James Camareta Tabloid Club Edit) – 4:27
 "Paparazzi" (Album Version) – 3:29
 "Paparazzi" (Instrumental Version) – 3:29

FRA / GER remix EP / GER CD single
 "Paparazzi" (Moto Blanco Edit) – 4:05
 "Paparazzi" (Moto Blanco Bostic Dub) – 6:42
 "Paparazzi" (Demolition Crew Remix) – 3:55
 "Paparazzi" (Stuart Price Remix) – 3:19
 "Paparazzi" (Filthy Dukes Club Mix) – 5:21
 "Paparazzi" (Yuksek Remix) – 4:47
 "Paparazzi" (James Camareta Tabloid Club Edit) – 4:27
 "Paparazzi" (Radio Edit) – 3:28

Credits and personnel
Credits adapted from the liner notes of The Fame.
 Lady Gaga – vocals, songwriting, co-production, piano, synthesizer
 Rob Fusari – songwriting, production
 Calvin "Sci-Fidelty" Gaines – programming
 Robert Orton – audio mixing
 Gene Grimaldi – audio mastering at Oasis Mastering, Burbank, California
 Recorded at 150 Studios, Parsippany-Troy Hills, New Jersey

Charts

Weekly charts

Year-end charts

Decade-end charts

Certifications and sales

Release history

See also

 List of best-selling singles of the 2000s (Australia)
 List of Billboard Mainstream Top 40 number-one songs of 2009
 List of number-one songs of the 2000s (Czech Republic)
 List of number-one hits of 2009 (Germany)
 List of number-one dance singles of 2009 (U.S.)
 List of Billboard Hot 100 top-ten singles in 2009

References

2008 songs
2009 singles
Cherrytree Records singles
Interscope Records singles
Lady Gaga songs
Music videos directed by Jonas Åkerlund
Number-one singles in Germany
Songs about the media
Songs written by Lady Gaga
Songs written by Rob Fusari
Songs about stalking
Number-one singles in Scotland
Songs about fame
2000s ballads
Pop ballads